BBC BASIC is a version of the BASIC programming language released in 1981 as the native programming language for the BBC Micro home/personal computer, providing a standardized language for a UK computer literacy project of the BBC. It was written mainly by Sophie Wilson.

BBC BASIC, based on the older Atom BASIC for the Acorn Atom, extended contemporary microcomputer BASICs with named DEF PROC/DEF FN procedures and functions, REPEAT UNTIL loops, and IF THEN ELSE structures inspired by COMAL. The interpreter also included statements for controlling the BBC Micro's four-channel sound output and its low-/high-resolution eight-mode graphics display.

Due to a number of optimizations, BBC BASIC ran programs much faster than Microsoft BASIC running on similar machines. The optimizations included using multiple linked lists for variable lookup rather than a single long list, pre-defining the location of integer variables, and having separate integer maths routines. Speed was further improved on the BBC machine by its fast RAM chips, which allowed the MOS Technology 6502 processor and Motorola 6845 display driver to share memory without either pausing for access. As a result of these design features, BBC BASIC ran David Ahl's Creative Computing Benchmark in 21 seconds, besting even the IBM Personal Computer, and far outpacing most other 8-bit platforms. The only commercial 8-bit BASIC computers that were as fast as the BBC Micro were the Swedish ABC 80 and ABC 800. The improved BASIC 4 on the BBC Master executes the same benchmark in about seven seconds.

One of the unique features of BBC BASIC was the inline assembler, allowing users to write assembly language programs for the 6502 and, later, the Zilog Z80, NS32016 and ARM. The assembler was fully integrated into the BASIC interpreter and shared variables with it, which could be included between the [ and ] characters, saved via *SAVE and *LOAD, and called via the CALL or USR commands. This allowed developers to write not just assembly language code, but also BASIC code to emit assembly language, making it possible to use code-generation techniques and even write simple compilers in BASIC.

History
In 1978 Hermann Hauser and Chris Curry founded Acorn Computers. Much of the code was developed at Cambridge University by Sophie Wilson and her colleagues. Starting with the original Acorn dialect of BASIC — "12K of working language which could be 'bent at will'" that had been informed by Algol W and BCPL in its design — Wilson "set about bending it towards Pascal" in collaboration with John Coll, creating a language combining "Microsoft necessities" and "Pascal-ish variations". Some Pascal-influenced features such as labels and multi-line conditional statements had to be dropped, however, due to broad compatibility expectations with Microsoft BASIC, ostensibly imposed by the requirements of the BBC.

Platforms and versions

BBC Micro

The full version list is available here:

BASIC I, the original version, was shipped on early BBC Micros.

BASIC II was used on the Acorn Electron and BBC Micros shipped after 1982, including the Model B. It added the OPENUP and OSCLI keywords, along with offset assembly and bug fixes.

BASIC III, was produced in both a UK version and a United States market version for Acorn's abortive attempt to enter the cross-Atlantic computer market. Apart from a few bug fixes, the only change from BASIC II was that the COLOUR command could also be spelled COLOR: regardless of which was input, the UK version always listed it as COLOUR, the US version as COLOR. The main place that BASIC III can be found is as the HI-BASIC version for the external second processor.

BASIC IV, also known as CMOS BASIC, available on the BBC Master machines, was changed to use the new instructions available in the 65SC12 processor, reducing the size of the code and therefore allowing the inclusion of LIST IF, EXT# as a statement, EDIT, TIME$, ON PROC, | in VDU statements and faster floating point. Bug fixes were again included.

BASIC IV(1986) was a further improvement to BASIC IV, and was included on the Master Compact machine. The version of BASIC on the Compact included re-coded mathematical routines, said to provide a 30% speed increase over the version included in the rest of the Master series.

HI-BASIC: this was available in two versions, the first based on BASIC III, and the second based on BASIC IV. Both were built to run from a higher address (&B800) on the second processor, rather than the usual &8000 address on the BBC B. This allowed more program space to be available on either the external or internal 6502 Second Processors. A version was introduced to support a second Zilog Z80 processor.

Another version of BBC BASIC, called BAS128, was supplied on tape and disc with the BBC Master and Master Compact; it loaded into main RAM and used the 64 kB of Sideways RAM for user programs. This provided support for much larger programs at the cost of being a lot slower than the normal ROM-based version.

The interpreter can deal with both BASIC and 6502 assembly language, which can be included between the [ and ] characters. This contributed to the system's popularity with industrial and research engineers.

Further details/Determining BASIC version
As the BBC MOS and RISC OS were usually supplied on ROM, it may be assumed that a specific release of the operating system contained a specific version of BASIC. As such, there is no simple way to determine which version of BASIC is actually running other than by enquiring the operating system identity and thus making an assumption.

See also BeebWiki entry for INKEY.

On the BBC family, it is possible to run both the standard BASIC and an enhanced HIBASIC on the 6502 Second Processor. One may determine if the program is running on the second processor by examining the initial value of PAGE, it will be &800 if using the second processor. To distinguish between BASIC and HIBASIC, one should examine the initial value of HIMEM. This will be &8000 for BASIC running on the second processor, and &B800 for HIBASIC on the second processor.

A similar situation exists on RISC OS where there may be the normal BASIC or BASIC64 (which offers higher precision maths). Normal BASIC identifies itself as "BASIC V" and BASIC64 identifies itself as "BASIC VI", therefore the following (used before any error has occurred) will distinguish one from the other:

IF INSTR(REPORT$,"VI") THEN PRINT "BASIC64" ELSE PRINT "BASIC"

There are better ways of doing this. See the BeebWiki. In almost all cases you shouldn't need to be testing for what BASIC or platform your program is running on, just make the call and read whatever returned data are returned and deal with it.

Acorn Archimedes (RISC OS)

With the move to the 32-bit ARM CPU and the removal of the 16 KB limit on the BASIC code size many new features were added. BASIC V version 1.04 was 61 KB long. Current versions of RISC OS still contain a BBC BASIC V interpreter. The source code to the RISC OS 5 version of BBC BASIC V has been released under the Apache 2.0 license by RISC OS Open. In 2011 TBA Software released test versions of an updated BASIC which includes support for VFP/NEON from assembler.

Amongst the new commands and features supported were:

 WHILE-ENDWHILE
 IF-THEN-ELSE-ENDIF
 CASE-OF-WHEN-OTHERWISE-ENDCASE,
 RETURN parameters in procedures,
 local arrays,
 procedure libraries (LIBRARY,INSTALL and OVERLAY),
 LOCAL DATA and LOCAL ERROR handlers,
 a relative RESTORE,
 array operations,
 new operators,
 STEP TRACE,
 Commands for the new sound system, mouse, graphics.

The graphics commands were entirely backwards compatible, the sound less so; for example, the ENVELOPE keyword from BASIC V onwards is a command that takes fourteen numeric parameters and effectively does nothing— as in older versions, it calls OS_Word 8, but that does nothing on RISC OS. The in-line 6502 assembler was replaced by an ARM assembler. BASIC V was said, by Acorn, to be "certainly the fastest interpreted BASIC in the world" and "probably the most powerful BASIC found on any computer".

BASIC VI is a version of BASIC V that supports IEEE 754 8-byte format real numbers, as opposed to the standard 5-byte format introduced in BASIC I.

BBC BASIC V and VI were delivered as standard on the Acorn Archimedes and the RiscPC. A version of BBC BASIC V was also available to run on the ARM second processor for the BBC Micro.

A compiler for BBC BASIC V was produced by Paul Fellows, team leader of the Arthur OS development, called the Archimedes BASIC Compiler and published initially by DABS Press. ABC was able to implement almost all of the language, with the obvious exception of the EVAL function, which inevitably required run-time programmatic interpretation. As evidence of its completeness, it was able to support in-line assembler syntax. The compiler was written in BBC BASIC V. The compiler (running under the interpreter in the early development stages) was able to compile itself, and versions that were distributed were self-compiled object code. Many applications initially written to run under the interpreter benefitted from the performance boost that this gave, putting BBC BASIC V on a par with other languages for serious application development.

Other platforms
BBC BASIC has also been ported to many other platforms.

A NS32016 version of BBC BASIC was supplied with the Acorn 32016 coprocessor and Acorn ABC.

In addition to the version of BBC BASIC supplied with the BBC Micro's Zilog Z80 Second processor, a Z80-based version of BBC BASIC also exists for CP/M-based systems.  
A Zilog Z80 version of BBC BASIC was also used on the Tiki 100 desktop computer, Cambridge Z88 portable and the Amstrad NC100 Notepad and Amstrad NC200 Notebook computers. This version has been implemented on the TI-83 Plus and TI-84 Plus series graphing calculators. Due to efforts of J. G. Harston (also responsible for a PDP-11 version) a version of BBC BASIC for the Sinclair ZX Spectrum was released in January 2002, with many improvements made in subsequent releases.

For PC-based systems, BBC BASIC was also implemented for DOS as BBCBASIC (86), which aimed for maximum compatibility with the BBC Micro, and BBasic, which concentrated on the BASIC language, with its own enhancements based on BASIC II.

A version of BBC BASIC integrated with the Microsoft Windows graphical user interface, BBC BASIC for Windows created by Richard Russell, developer of the Z80 and x86 versions, was released in 2001. This version is still under active development, seeing much industry use currently. Whilst supporting nearly completely the original BBC BASIC specification (BASIC IV), the Windows version supports much of BASIC V/VI syntax as well as some advanced features of its own. Features unique to BBC BASIC for Windows include interpreter support for record/structure types, and the ability to call Windows API routines or those in an external DLL. Recent versions have included advanced features comparable with languages like C, and an external library has recently added support for objects.

BBC BASIC for SDL was also developed by Richard T. Russell, supporting Windows, Linux and a number of mobile devices supporting the SDL library, as well as a version which allows the running of BBC BASIC programs as applets in a web-page via the Web Assembly framework.

A GPL clone of BBC BASIC named Brandy, written in portable C, is also available.

An emulator of the BBC Micro for the Commodore Amiga was produced by Ariadne Software for CBM (UK). While extremely fast, it did not emulate the 6502 at full speed, so assembly code would run slower than a real BBC while BASIC programs would run much faster. Due to the way the optimised BASIC and the 6502 emulation interacted, almost no commercial games would run but well-behaved code and educational software generally worked. Additionally, it used a slightly less precise floating-point numeric format. For a while it was bundled with a special academic package of the Amiga 500, in the hope that schools would replace their ageing BBC Bs with Amiga 500s.

BBC Micro publishing house Computer Concepts produced a version of BBC Basic for the Atari ST, named Fast ST BASIC, as a ROM cartridge.

A version of BBC BASIC V (Z80) has also been made for the TI-83/84+ Texas Instruments calculator families by Benjamin Ryves.

A Commodore 64 version Shado was produced by a small software house Aztec Software in the early 1980s.  Patched Versions of Acorn's 6502 based HI-BASIC have also been experimentally run on C64, with an interface to the C64 Kernel, replacing the Acorn MOS calls otherwise made.

There have also been efforts to make 6502 based version of BBC BASIC available on the Apple II series of computers. Applecorn being one such effort.

BBC BASIC is the programming language used in the Agon Light, an open-sourced 8-bit Z80-based single board computer and microcontroller designed by Bernardo Kastrup and released in 2022.

Notes

See also
 Dot space

References

External links
 
 http://www.rtrussell.co.uk/products/
 http://mdfs.net/bbcbasic/
 TI-83+ and TI-84+ implementation of BBC BASIC
 The Amstrad NC Users' Site
 Ebook programming guide with interfacing methods
 BBC BASIC Reference Manual (for RISC OS)
 BBC microcomputer User Guide (HTML)
 BBC microcomputer User Guide (PDF)
 Python code vs BBC Basic for Windows
 R.T. Russell's Z80 BBC Basic is now open source at GitHub

BASIC programming language family
BASIC interpreters
Acorn Computers
RISC OS programming tools
CP/M software
Discontinued BASICs
Programming languages created in 1981
Programming languages created by women